"First Day Out" is a song by American rapper Tee Grizzley. It was released on November 7, 2016, by 300 Entertainment as the lead single from his debut mixtape, My Moment (2017). It was written by Tee Grizzley and Helluva, and produced by the latter.

The single peaked at number 48 on the US Billboard Hot 100.

Background
Tee Grizzley was released from Michigan prison in October 2016 and recorded the song on the same day.

This song is about how he went to jail, what it was like, and how it felt when he was released. The song went viral in a video of Los Angeles Lakers player LeBron James taking a video to this song, creating the "LeBron James Challenge", where people post videos of themselves reenacting James's movements in the video.

Music video
The music video of "First Day Out" was uploaded to YouTube on Joseph McFashion's "4sho Magazine" channel on November 7, 2016. It was directed by Nick Margetic and Everett Stewart.

Remix
On February 5, 2018, the official remix was released featuring American rapper Meek Mill.

Charts

Weekly charts

Year-end charts

Certifications

References

2016 songs
2016 singles
Tee Grizzley songs